Anthony Lemont Peters (born April 28, 1953) is a former professional American football safety for ten seasons in the National Football League (NFL) for the Cleveland Browns and Washington Redskins.  He played college football at the University of Oklahoma.

He helped the Redskins win Super Bowl XVII, and earned Pro Bowl honors for the 1982 season.

1953 births
Living people
Sportspeople from Oklahoma City
American football safeties
Cleveland Browns players
Washington Redskins players
National Conference Pro Bowl players
Oklahoma Sooners football players
Players of American football from Oklahoma